The women's 60 metres event  at the 1992 European Athletics Indoor Championships was held in Palasport di Genova on 29 February.

Medalists

Results

Heats
First 3 from each heat (Q) and the next 7 fastest (q) qualified for the semifinals.

Semifinals
First 4 from each semifinal qualified directly (Q) for the final.

Final

References

60 metres at the European Athletics Indoor Championships
60
1992 in women's athletics